Contortipalpia is a genus of moths of the family Crambidae.

Species
Contortipalpia masculina Munroe, 1964
Contortipalpia santiagalis (Schaus, 1920)

References

Glaphyriinae
Crambidae genera
Taxa named by Eugene G. Munroe